Krisztián Csillag (born 13 June 1975) is a Hungarian footballer who played for BVSC Budapest as midfielder.

External links
Profile at hlsz.hu

1975 births
Living people
People from Kazincbarcika
Hungarian footballers
Association football midfielders
MTK Budapest FC players
III. Kerületi TUE footballers
Budapesti VSC footballers
Újpest FC players
Fehérvár FC players
BKV Előre SC footballers
Százhalombattai LK footballers
FC Dabas footballers
Nyíregyháza Spartacus FC players
Vecsés FC footballers
Budaörsi SC footballers
Sportspeople from Borsod-Abaúj-Zemplén County